Gibina is a Slovene place name that may refer to:

 Gibina, Razkrižje, a village in the Municipality of Razkrižje, northeastern Slovenia
 Gibina, Sveti Andraž v Slovenskih Goricah, a village in the Municipality of Sveti Andraž v Slovenskih Goricah, northeastern Slovenia